Johannes Kolling (25 March 1887 – 1 February 1969) was a Dutch fencer. He competed in the individual sabre event at the 1912 Summer Olympics.

References

1887 births
1969 deaths
Dutch male fencers
Olympic fencers of the Netherlands
Fencers at the 1912 Summer Olympics
Sportspeople from Surabaya
Dutch people of the Dutch East Indies